Ajay Manikrao Khanwilkar (born 30 July 1957) is a former Judge of the Supreme Court of India. He has also served as the Chief Justice of Madhya Pradesh High Court and Himachal Pradesh High Court and Judge of Bombay High Court.

Career
He was enrolled as Advocate on 10 February 1982. He joined the chamber of Advocate Prafulachandra M Pradhan at Mulund. He practiced on Civil, Criminal and Constitutional sides before the Subordinate Courts, Tribunals and High Court of Judicature at Bombay on the Appellate side and Original side. He also practiced exclusively in the Supreme Court of India from July 1984. 

He was appointed Additional Judge of the Bombay High Court on 29 March 2000 and confirmed as permanent Judge on 8 April 2002.

He was appointed Chief Justice of the High court of Himachal Pradesh on 4 April 2013. Thereafter he was appointed Chief Justice of Madhya Pradesh High Court on 24 November 2013 and elevated to Supreme Court on 13 May 2016. 

He retired from the judgeship of the Supreme Court  of India on 29 July 2022 after being in the apex court for 6 years, 2 months and 17 days. After his retirement, a detailed analysis of his judgments was published on 29 July 2022 by The Wire.

References

Further reading
 
 

1957 births
Living people
Chief Justices of the Madhya Pradesh High Court
Chief Justices of the Himachal Pradesh High Court
Judges of the Bombay High Court
People from Pune
Justices of the Supreme Court of India
20th-century Indian judges
21st-century Indian judges
University of Mumbai alumni